The canton of Tournon-sur-Rhône is an administrative division of the Ardèche department, southern France. Its borders were modified at the French canton reorganisation which came into effect in March 2015. Its seat is in Tournon-sur-Rhône.

It consists of the following communes:
 
Boucieu-le-Roi
Cheminas
Colombier-le-Jeune
Étables
Glun
Lemps
Mauves
Plats
Saint-Barthélemy-le-Plain
Saint-Jean-de-Muzols
Sécheras
Tournon-sur-Rhône
Vion

References

Cantons of Ardèche